Warhammer 40,000: Darktide is a first-person action video game set in the Warhammer 40,000 universe, developed and published by Fatshark. It is a spiritual successor to Warhammer: Vermintide series. It was released for Microsoft Windows on 30 November 2022. The release for Xbox Series X/S will be revealed by Paul Naylor of the entertainment zone 
at a later date.

Gameplay
The game uses a similar formula to that used in Fatshark's Warhammer: Vermintide 2 in which four players cooperate to defeat periodic waves of AI-controlled enemies. Rather than a set of pre-made characters, the game allows players to customize their class, appearance, and gender. The four classes consist of a Veteran, Zealot, Ogryn, and Psyker. All classes make use of a regenerating shield.

Unlike in Vermintide 2, multiple missions will take place in the same area, some of which include optional secondary objectives that allow players to obtain better loot. Difficulty has been divided into two variables, one affecting enemy count and the other damage received from enemies. Progression is split between random rewards, an in-game currency that will allow the purchase of weapons and a contract system to earn a weapon of your choice. Crafting also allows the player to upgrade their weapons and increase their stats.

Plot
The game's story, written by author Dan Abnett, will focus on a squad of Inquisitorial Agents investigating a potential Chaos infiltration in the Hive City of Tertium on the industrial planet of Atoma Prime.

The player character Operative begins the story detained aboard the prison transport Tancred Bastion for a crime determined during player creation. During transport the Tancred Bastion is suddenly swarmed and overwhelmed by followers of the Chaos god Nurgle. The player rescues Explicator Zola and the two successfully evacuate the ship. Zola agrees to spare the player from the death penalty by conscripting them to the Inquisition. From their base aboard the ship Mourningstar, the Inquisition deploys the Operative to different sectors within Tertium to research and suppress the Nurgle infestation and cult.

Once onboard the ship, the player begins to earn the trust of the Mourningstar's different members, all of whom are subservient to Inquisitor Grendyl. They must enter the depths of Atoma's largest hive, Tertium, and foil the plans  of the chaos cult by claiming supply drops, investigating the daemonic plague, assassinating leaders of the renegade Planetary Defense Forces and reclaiming important facilities across the city. After some time, it is discovered that the Mourningstar has been infiltrated by a spy for the cult, who was sending out detailed reports of the Inquisition's operations and subsequently killing off entire squads of elite agents planetside. Interrogator Rannick, the right hand man of Grendyl, leads the investigation of the Mourningstar's mole problem while also showing interest in the player's progress. Once enough trust is earned, Rannick welcomes the Player fully into the Inquisition while also killing the traitor once and for all. After this, the player continues their ongoing mission to purge the corruption of Nurgle in Tertium as a full member of the warband 

The plot is set to evolve over time in a manner that parallels a live service, continuing to develop on a weekly basis and following a set meta narrative.

Development
The game was first announced in July 2020 during the Xbox Series X and Series S showcase event in which Fatshark showed plans for a 2021 release. A gameplay trailer was released on 10 December 2020, which showcased the use of weapons such as a Lasgun and a chainsword being used to defeat hordes of Poxwalkers and chaos traitors. Among the playable characters, an Imperial Guardsman and an Ogryn could be observed. The developers commented that Darktide is planned to be less melee focused than Vermintide 2, getting closer to a 50/50 split between melee and ranged combat. 

In July 2021 Fatshark announced that due to difficulties arising as a result of the COVID-19 pandemic, the release date would be pushed back from 2021 to spring 2022. The release date was again pushed back to 13 September 2022 in an announcement which was accompanied by a new trailer. A further delay pushing the release back to 30 November 2022 was later announced.

A closed beta was made available to some players on 14 October 2022 and ran for two days.

On January 24 2023, Martin Wahlund, CEO & Co-Founder of Fatshark, announced that development on new content was paused while the studio focused on improving progression, stability and performance, in response to the negative reception the game received post-launch.

Reception 

According to Metacritic, Warhammer 40,000: Darktide has received "mixed or average reviews", based on 68 reviews. As of 22 January 2023, the game faced sharp player falloff and negative reviews on Steam for the perceived unfinished state of the game and a lack of communication surrounding updates or improvements.

References

External links
 

Action video games
First-person shooters
Video games developed in Sweden
Darktide
Windows games
Xbox Series X and Series S games
2022 video games
Fatshark games
First-person shooter multiplayer online games
Cooperative video games
Video games set on fictional planets